Antonina Latinik-Rieger (17 October 1906 – 18 October 1989) was a Polish fencer, first champion of Poland in woman's foil fencing, teacher, and an official of the Kraków Curia.

Biography 
She was born in 1906 as a third daughter of captain Franciszek Latinik and Helena Stiasny-Strzelbicka, younger sister of Anna (1902–1969) and Irena (1904–1975).

She graduated in physical education and geography from Jagiellonian University.

In years 1927–1928 Antonina was a fencer of AZS Kraków. In 1928 she won the first Polish championship in woman's foil fencing, outrunning Maria Wanda Dubieńska and Jadwiga Rieger.

Latinik worked as a school teacher, she taught physical education and geography; for many years she worked as an official of Kraków Curia. She was awarded with a Vatican distinction Pro Ecclesia et Pontifice.

Her husband, Andrzej Rieger (1906–1940), prosecutor and second lieutenant of Polish Army reserve, was killed in Katyn massacre. Antonina and Andrzej had two sons: Janusz (born 1934) and Jerzy.

She died in 1989 and was buried in the family tomb at the Rakowicki Cemetery in Kraków.

References 

Polish female foil fencers
Sportspeople from Kraków
Jagiellonian University alumni
Burials at Rakowicki Cemetery
1906 births
1989 deaths
20th-century Polish women